Spiromoelleria kachemakensis is a species of small sea snail with calcareous opercula, a marine gastropod mollusk in the family Colloniidae.

Distribution
This marine species occurs off Alaska.

References

External links
 To Biodiversity Heritage Library (1 publication)
 To Encyclopedia of Life
 To USNM Invertebrate Zoology Mollusca Collection
 To ITIS
 To World Register of Marine Species

Colloniidae
Gastropods described in 1984